Chinchwad Assembly constituency is one of the twenty one constituencies of the Maharashtra Vidhan Sabha located in the city of Pune, India.

It is a part of the Maval (Lok Sabha constituency) along with five other assembly constituencies: Pimpri and Maval from the Pune District and Karjat, Uran and Panvel from the Raigad district.

The last Legislator representing this constituency was Laxman Pandurang Jagtap, who won as an independent in 2009 and as a BJP candidate in 2014 Vidhan Sabha elections. By-election are conducted due to death of existing MLA.

Members of Legislative Assembly

Bypoll Elections denoted by ^

Areas 
Rahatani
Pimple Saudagar
Wakad
Thergaon
Punawale
Whalekarwadi
Rawet Goan
 Samawishata Kiwale Mamurdi
 Kalewadi
Pimple Gurav
Aundh Camp
Sangvi
Dapodi
 Pimple Nilakh

Election results

2023 by-election

Assembly elections 2019

Assembly elections 2014

Assembly elections 2009

See also
 Maval
 List of constituencies of Maharashtra Legislative Assembly

References

Assembly constituencies of Pune district
Pimpri-Chinchwad
Assembly constituencies of Maharashtra